Kwon Soon-young (born June 15, 1996), professionally known by his stage name Hoshi, is a South Korean singer, dancer and choreographer under Pledis Entertainment. He is a member of the boy group Seventeen and the leader of the Performance Team. He is also part of the special unit BSS. Hoshi released his first solo mixtape, Spider, on April 2, 2021.

Early life 
Kwon Soon-young was born in Namyangju, Gyeonggi Province, South Korea. Hoshi attended Maseok High School and then enrolled in Hanyang University.

Career

2011-2014: Pre-debut 
He joined Pledis Entertainment in late 2011, where he received training for the next 4 years. In 2013, he appeared on Seventeen TV, an online reality show that introduced Pledis' trainees and showed potential members of the boy group Seventeen before their official debut. The show was broadcast periodically on Ustream, where the trainees showed themselves training, singing, creating choreographies and playing games. The online show also included participation in concerts, titled Like Seventeen.

2015–present: Seventeen and solo activities 
In 2015, Hoshi debuted as a member of the South Korean boy group Seventeen with the extended play 17 Carat on May 29. Alongside members Seungkwan and DK, Hoshi also joined a special unit called 'BSS' or BooSeokSoon, a common nickname for the three members together. The group released their debut single "Just Do It" on March 21, 2018.

On April 2, 2021, Hoshi released his first solo mixtape, Spider. Hoshi participated in the overall production process of the song, including lyrics and performance. Spider reached the top 10 in 48 regions on iTunes song charts.

Philanthropy
In March 2020, it was known that Hoshi personally donated ₩50 million (US$42,694) through the Hope Bridge National Disaster Relief Association. The donation will be used to purchase quarantine supplies for the underprivileged affected by COVID-19 and to support medical staff and volunteers. 

In April 2020, on behalf of Hoshi, his father Kwon Hyuk-doo visited the Administrative Welfare Center in Hwado-dong, Namyangju, and delivered ₩1.54 million worth of eco-friendly sterilized water to the Gyeonggi Community Chest of Korea. On October 29, 2020, Maseok High School in Gyeonggi Province announced that Hoshi donated ₩23.1 million in scholarships for enrolled students in need. According to officials, Hoshi's parents expressed extraordinary gratitude to Maseok High School and its faculty.

According to the Gyeonggi Northern Social Welfare Community Chest, Hoshi donated ₩100 million to the Namyangju Welfare Foundation on June 10, 2021, and joined the Honor Society, a club of high-value donors of love. Hoshi's donation was held to commemorate his 26th birthday and he joined the sponsorship activities after hearing that more and more neighbors were in need of help in the community. The amount will be used for underprivileged such as abused children, single-parent families, disabled and more, through care centers in Namyangju. 

In December 2021, Namyangju City announced that it delivered a plaque of appreciation to Hoshi, for his contribution to revitalizing the donation culture. "I sincerely thank Hoshi, a donation angel who does not forget the community and spreads good influence through various methods and continuous donations," said Choi Dae-jip, head of the Hwado Sudong Administrative Welfare Center, who delivered a plaque of appreciation on behalf of Namyangju Mayor Cho Kwang-han.

Discography

Mixtapes

Filmography

Television shows

Web shows

Music video appearances

Composition credits
All credits are adapted from the Korea Music Copyright Association unless stated otherwise.

References

External links 

1996 births
Living people
People from Namyangju
South Korean male idols
21st-century South Korean male singers
Pledis Entertainment artists
Hybe Corporation artists